Holy Trinity Parish - designated for Polish immigrants in Westfield, Massachusetts, United States.

 Founded 1903. It is one of the Polish-American Roman Catholic parishes in New England in the Diocese of Springfield in Massachusetts.

Bibliography 
 
 The Official Catholic Directory in USA

External links 
 Holy Trinity - Diocesan Information
 Holy Trinity - ParishesOnline.com
 Diocese of Springfield in Massachusetts

Roman Catholic parishes of Diocese of Springfield in Massachusetts
Polish-American Roman Catholic parishes in Massachusetts